Jair Rodrigues Júnior (born 26 August 1994), known simply as Jair, is a Brazilian footballer who plays as a centre midfielder for Vasco da Gama.

Career
Born in Ibirubá, Rio Grande do Sul, Jair began his career at Sport Club Internacional. He was first included in a senior matchday squad on 14 September 2012, remaining an unused substitute in a 1–1 draw at Botafogo de Futebol e Regatas in the year's Campeonato Brasileiro Série A.

On 21 May 2014, he made his debut by replacing Alex  after 50 minutes of an eventual 1–1 draw at Coritiba Foot Ball Club. He made his first start on 14 August in the third round second leg of the year's Copa do Brasil, playing the first 33 minutes of a 3–1 loss at Ceará Sporting Club (5–2 aggregate). He played his first Campeonato Gaúcho game on 14 February 2016, featuring for the entirety of a 1–1 draw at Clube Esportivo Aimoré.

Jair left Internacional in 2017 and had a series of spells at Rio Verde, Boa Esporte, Veranópolis and Juventude, before joining Sport Recife on 29 August 2018. He made 13 appearances in the 2018 Série A season, scoring twice in a 4–3 away win over Grêmio.

On 3 January 2019, Jair joined Atlético Mineiro on a four-year deal.

On 10 January 2023, Jair joined Vasco da Gama for a transfer fee of $2.5 million on a permanent deal from Atlético Mineiro.

Career statistics

Honours
Internacional
Campeonato Gaúcho: 2013, 2014, 2015, 2016

Atlético Mineiro
Campeonato Brasileiro Série A: 2021
Copa do Brasil: 2021
Campeonato Mineiro: 2020, 2021, 2022
Supercopa do Brasil: 2022

Individual
Campeonato Brasileiro Série A Team of the Year: 2021
Bola de Prata: 2021

References

External links

Internacional profile

1994 births
Living people
Sportspeople from Rio Grande do Sul
Brazilian footballers
Association football midfielders
Sport Club Internacional players
Esporte Clube Rio Verde players
Boa Esporte Clube players
Veranópolis Esporte Clube Recreativo e Cultural
Esporte Clube Juventude players
Sport Club do Recife players
Clube Atlético Mineiro players
CR Vasco da Gama players
Campeonato Brasileiro Série A players
Campeonato Brasileiro Série B players